Mako shark may refer to:

Shortfin mako shark - a common species of the genus Isurus
Longfin mako shark - a rarer species of the genus Isurus
Corvette Mako Shark (concept car), a concept car made by Chevrolet